The ABA Roger Tory Peterson Award for Promoting the Cause of Birding is an award given by the American Birding Association to an individual who, over the course of a lifetime, has advanced the cause of birding. 

One of five awards presented by the ABA for contributions to ornithology, the award is named in honor of Roger Tory Peterson.  As author, artist, and educator, Peterson "furthered the study, appreciation and protection of birds the world over," was nominated for the Nobel Peace Prize, and served as one of the inspirations for the 20th century environmental movement.

The award was first bestowed on Arnold Small.

List of recipients
The award was introduced in 2000.

Source:

See also

 List of ornithology awards

References

Ornithology awards
American Birding Association
Awards established in 2000